George Rodgers may refer to:

 George Rodgers (VC) (1829–1870), Scottish recipient of the Victoria Cross
 George Rodgers (footballer) (1899–1982), Scottish footballer (Chelsea)
 George Rodgers (politician) (1925–2000), British Labour Party politician
 George Washington Rodgers (1822–1863), officer of the United States Navy

See also 
 George Rodger (1908–1995), British photojournalist
 George Rogers (disambiguation)